Soeris Baidjoe (born 9 October 1981) is a Dutch footballer who plays as a striker for Heidebloem Dilsen.

Club career
Baidjoe played for Eerste Divisie club TOP Oss during the 2004–05 season.

He moved abroad to play for Belgian sides Patro Eisden, RS Waasland, Excelsior Veldwezelt and Racing Mechelen and joined Tienen in summer 2013. He moved to Spouwen-Mopertingen in 2015, before joining FC Anadol the following year. He moved to La Squadra Maasmechelen Futsal in 2017.

References

External links
Voetbal International profile

1981 births
Living people
Dutch sportspeople of Surinamese descent
Association football forwards
Dutch footballers
TOP Oss players
K. Patro Eisden Maasmechelen players
S.K. Beveren players
K.R.C. Mechelen players
K.V.K. Tienen-Hageland players
Eerste Divisie players
Dutch expatriate footballers
Expatriate footballers in Belgium
Dutch expatriate sportspeople in Belgium